Posto (Here, a name for the child character of film. Meaning: Poppy Seeds) is a 2017 Bengali film directed by Nandita Roy and Shiboprosad Mukherjee. The film features Soumitra Chatterjee, Jisshu Sengupta and Mimi Chakraborty. The film was released on 12 May 2017 in 100 theatres across West Bengal, India and overseas (United States, Canada, Japan, Dubai, United Kingdom, Netherlands) on the same day. The film received critical acclaim as it portrayed the relationships in a very subtle way.

Plot 
Arko, affectionately called Posto (Arghya Basu Roy), is a little boy raised by his grandparents—Dinen Lahiri (Soumitra Chatterjee) and Gouri Lahiri (Lily Chakraborty)—in Santiniketan. His parents, Arnab Lahiri (Jisshu Sengupta) and Sushmita Lahiri (Mimi Chakraborty), are both settled in Kolkata. They only visit their son once on the weekend. A clash between the grandparents and parents begins when the latter want to take away the child as the father gets an offer to start a restaurant business abroad. The relationship between the parents of Posto and his grandparents, which eventually sours, drags the kid into the courtroom.

Cast
 Soumitra Chatterjee as Dinen Lahiri 
 Jisshu Sengupta as Arnab Lahiri 
 Lily Chakraborty as Gouri Lahiri 
 Mimi Chakraborty as Sushmita Lahiri, Arnab's wife
 Paran Bandopadhyay as Alok, The lawyer and friend of Dinen Lahiri
 Argha Basu Roy as Arko / Posto
 Sohini Sengupta
 Siddartha Chatterjee as a Judge
 Malabika Sen as a Teacher

Release  
The movie released on 12 May 2017. Its theatrical release created quite a buzz. Posto was later made part of the Family Welfare course organised by the State.
Nandu Ahuja, Senior VP, India Theatrical, Eros International Media Ltd, said, "History repeats itself as Posto, our third film with Shiboprosad and Nandita, is well on its way to become another blockbuster after Belaseshe and Praktan. We are happy with the response the film has received in Kolkata and hope the film will similarly woo audiences across the country."

Box office 
On the first day, the movie collection 2 million rupees ( 21 lakh). In the first four days, the film's earnings were 10 million (.  In 1st 2 weeks, the collection breached 35 million (3.5 crores). After 17 days, the box office collection crossed 4.5 crores. After the 1st 3 weeks, the movie had done a business of   5 crores. At the end of 4 weeks, the movie had done a business of  5.5 crore from the state of West Bengal alone and a worldwide business of  8 crores.

Soundtrack 
The soundtrack is composed by Anupam Roy, with lyrics by himself.
Nachiketa Chakrabarty won the Filmfare award for best playback singer (Male), 2018, for the song Keno Erom Kichu Holona. It’s a song about distance between relationships and Nachiketa’s melodious voice effectively brings forth the nuances contained in the composition. 

The soundtrack is composed by Anupam Roy, with lyrics by himself.

References

External links
 

2017 films
Films scored by Anupam Roy
Films directed by Nandita Roy and Shiboprosad Mukherjee
Bengali-language Indian films
2010s Bengali-language films